Glen Ellyn is a station on Metra's Union Pacific West Line, located in Glen Ellyn, Illinois. The station is located at 551 Crescent Boulevard in Glen Ellyn. Unless otherwise announced, inbound trains use the north platform and outbound trains use the south platform. The middle track does not have platform access.

As of December 5, 2022, Glen Ellyn is served by all 57 trains (all 29 inbound, 28 outbound) on weekdays, by all 10 trains in each direction on Saturdays, and by all nine trains in each direction on Sundays and holidays.

Glen Ellyn station is located at ground level and consists of two side platforms. Three tracks run between the platforms, though one does not access the station. There is a station house next to the inbound (north) track, which is open from 5:00 A.M. to 1:00 P.M. Tickets are available at the station house on weekdays. The Illinois Prairie Path runs along the south edge of the complex, running in the former Chicago Aurora and Elgin Railroad right-of-way.

References

External links 

Station House from Google Maps Street View

Metra stations in Illinois
Former Chicago and North Western Railway stations
Glen Ellyn, Illinois
Railway stations in DuPage County, Illinois
Former Chicago, Aurora, and Elgin stations
Railway stations in the United States opened in 1936
Union Pacific West Line